Kiwi FC is a Samoan football club based in Apia. It currently plays in the Samoa National League. The team has won the most titles of any Samoan football team (9 in total) - 7 leagues and 2 cups.

Honours

Samoa National League: 7
1984, 1985, 1997, 2010/11, 2011/12, 2013/14, 2018
Samoa Cup: 2
2010, 2014

OFC Champions League Records

1999 - 8th Place

Group Stage

Kiwi FC 0-13 Nadi FC

Kiwi FC 1-14 AS Vénus

2012-13 - 11th Place

Preliminary Round

Kiwi FC 5-1 Pago Youth

Kiwi FC 1-2 Tupapa Maraerenga

Kiwi FC 1-2 Lotoha'apai United

2013-14 - 12th Place

Preliminary Round

Kiwi FC 5-1 Pago Youth

Kiwi FC 4-2 Lotoha'apai United

Kiwi FC 3-0 Tupapa Maraerenga

Group Stage

Kiwi FC 0-2 Waitakere United

Kiwi FC 0-8 Pirae

Kiwi FC 0-8 Solomon Warriors

2016 - 12th Place

Preliminary Round

Kiwi FC 6-2 Utulei Youth

Kiwi FC 2-1 Tupapa Maraerenga

Kiwi FC 7-1 Veitongo

Group Stage

Kiwi FC 0-2 Magenta

Kiwi FC 3-4 Nadi

Kiwi FC 0-7 Tefana

The team returned to the league in 2019 after a two-year absence. They came second in the 2019 OFC Champions League qualifying stage, but was eliminated in the group stage.

Current squad
Squad for 2020 - 21 Samoan National League

Former players

  Adrián Cedeño

References

Football clubs in Samoa